ZhengZhou Shengda University Of Economics, Business & Management is a private college located just outside Zhengzhou, Henan, China.  The current campus is also called "ZhengZhou Shengda University Of Economics, Business & Management", and is intended to be a part of an eventual Shengda University. As of 2012, enrollment has surpassed 15,000 students.

The college was founded in 1994, through a partnership between the Taipei Guangxing Culture and Education Fund and Zhengzhou University, a national-level public university in Zhengzhou.  Under the late-1990s program to expand higher education in China, regulations required new colleges had to find "mother schools" to supervise them.

Riots 
Shengda College garnered international attention, when riots broke out among students on June 16, 2006. Students of the private college had been led to believe that their diplomas would read "Zhengzhou University", a respected public institution, without mention of Shengda.  Students of Shengda, often unable to gain entry to Zhengzhou University, were willing to pay tuition of US$2500 per year as opposed to $500 for the public university under the promise of a diploma that only mentioned the parent university.  However, regulations instituted in 2003 forced the school to include its own name and the diplomas received by the class of 2006 read "Zhengzhou University - Shengda Economic, Trade and Management College".  The reaction was one of the larger and more prolonged violent student demonstrations since the Tiananmen Square protests of 1989.  As a result of the riot, the headmaster of the school resigned.  The student reaction follows the steep rise in China of college graduates and tightening of the job market in the liberalizing economy.

References

External links 

 Shengda homepage

Universities and colleges in Zhengzhou
Educational institutions established in 1994
1994 establishments in China